Qeshlaq-e Damirchluy-e Qarah Qeshlaq Hajj Abil (also Romanized as Qeshlāq-e Damīrchlūy-e Qarah Qeshlāq-e Ḩājj Ābīl; also known as Damīrchīlū-ye Qarah Qeshlāq) is a village in Qeshlaq-e Jonubi Rural District, Qeshlaq Dasht District, Bileh Savar County, Ardabil Province, Iran. At the 2006 census, its population was 145, in 30 families.

References 

Towns and villages in Bileh Savar County